The Ringer (German: Der Hexer) is a 1932 Austrian-German mystery film directed by Martin Frič and Karel Lamač and starring Paul Richter, Maria Matray and Wera Engels. It is a screen adaptation of Edgar Wallace's 1925 novel The Ringer. Another German version, Der Hexer, was made in 1964. It was shot at the Sievering Studios in Vienna. The film's sets were designed by the art director Heinz Fenchel.

Synopsis
A master of disguise, the notorious "Ringer" has returned to London and is sending threatening messages to the criminal Maurice Meister. Inspector Wenbury of Scotland Yard is deputed to capture the elusive Ringer before he is able to murder Meister.

Cast
 Paul Richter as Inspektor Wenbury
 Maria Matray as Mary Lenley 
 Carl Walther Meyer as John Lenley
 Wera Engels as Cora Ann Milton
 Fritz Rasp as Maurice Meister
 Paul Henckels as Hauptinspektor Bliss
 Leopold Kramer as Polizeiarzt Dr. Lomond
 Karl Etlinger as Sam Hackitt
 Karl Forest as Oberst Walford
 Franz Schafheitlin as Wachtmeister Carter

See also
 The Ringer (1928)
 The Ringer (1931)
 The Gaunt Stranger (1938)
 The Ringer (1952)
 Der Hexer (1964)

References

Bibliography
 Bergfelder, Tim. International Adventures: German Popular Cinema and European Co-Productions in the 1960s. Berghahn Books, 2005.

External links
 

1932 films
1932 drama films
1930s mystery drama films
1930s German-language films
Films of the Weimar Republic
German mystery drama films
German black-and-white films
Films directed by Martin Frič
Films directed by Karel Lamač
Films based on works by Edgar Wallace
Films set in London
Films shot at Sievering Studios
1930s German films